Goniurosaurus gezhi, commonly known as the Gezhi cave gecko, is a gecko endemic to China.

References

Goniurosaurus
Reptiles of China
Reptiles described in 2020
Endemic fauna of China